Harry Barlow and Ernest Lewis defeated Harold Mahony and Joshua Pim 8–10, 6–3, 5–7, 11–9, 6–1 in the All Comers' Final, and then defeated the reigning champions Herbert Baddeley and Wilfred Baddeley 4–6, 6–2, 8–6, 6–4 in the challenge round to win the gentlemen's doubles tennis title at the 1892 Wimbledon Championships.

Draw

Challenge round

All Comers'

References

External links

Gentlemen's Doubles
Wimbledon Championship by year – Men's doubles